Marinospirillum insulare is a helical, Gram-negative and halophilic bacterium from the genus of Marinospirillum which has been isolated from fermented fish brine from the Niijima Island on Japan.

References

Oceanospirillales
Bacteria described in 2004